Nazar Louginets (born 31 May 1989) is a Russian sport shooter.

He participated at the 2018 ISSF World Shooting Championships, winning a medal.

References

External links

Living people
1989 births
Russian male sport shooters
ISSF rifle shooters
People from Novorossiysk
Universiade gold medalists for Russia
Universiade medalists in shooting
European Games competitors for Russia
Shooters at the 2015 European Games
Sportspeople from Krasnodar Krai